Moth and the Flame is a Silly Symphony that was released on April 1, 1938.

Plot
A group of moths invades a costume shop through a badly plugged hole in a window and makes quick work of the contents. A male moth ignores his lady to chow down on a hat and she's soon seduced by a candle flame, which rapidly spreads. He notices her trapped in a spider web with the fire attacking and makes some attempts to save her, but pours benzene on the fire by mistake. The rest of the moths are summoned, and they fight the fire with water-filled bagpipes, an air drop with a water-filled funnel, etc., while our hero works to free his lady from the spider web. The moths finally put the flame out with the help of an old top hat and it will never bother the lady moth again.

Home media
The short was released on December 19, 2006, on Walt Disney Treasures: More Silly Symphonies, Volume Two. Prior to that, the featurette also appeared on the Walt Disney Cartoon Classics Limited Gold Edition: Silly Symphonies VHS in the 1980s.

References

External links
 

1938 films
1938 short films
1930s Disney animated short films
Films directed by Burt Gillett
Films produced by Walt Disney
Silly Symphonies
1938 animated films
Animated films about insects
Animated films without speech
1930s American films